Jean-Baptiste Morvan de Bellegarde (30 August 1648, in Nantes – 26 April 1734), abbé de Bellegarde, was a French Jesuit for 15 years, before joining Francis de Sales's order. He was the author of a number of works on ethics, religion, and education, which included Réflexions sur le ridicule (1696) and Réflexions sur la politesse des mœurs (1698).

References

French Jesuits
1648 births
1734 deaths
Former Jesuits
Salesians of Don Bosco